The Mexican Road Race Championships are held annually to decide the Mexican cycling champions in the road race discipline, across various categories. The event was first held in 1998 and was won by Jesús Zárate. Mexico's Road Cycling Championships Started in 1998 by Federacion Mexicana de Ciclismo.

Men

Elite

U23

Women

Elite

References

National road cycling championships
Cycle racing in Mexico